is a Japanese actress. She won the Award for Best Newcomer at the 6th Yokohama Film Festival and at the 8th Japan Academy Prize for Aiko 16 sai. She also won the award for best actress at the 9th Yokohama Film Festival for Bu Su.  In 1995, she enjoyed career breakthrough as she won the Best Actress award at 1995 Tokyo International Film Festival for The Christ Of Nanjing.

Filmography

Film
Aiko 16 sai (1983)
Lonely Heart (1985)
Bu Su (1987)
The Christ Of Nanjing (1995)
Kitchen (1997)
My Neighbors the Yamadas (1999)
Love Tomato (2006)
Kimi ni Todoke (2010)
This Country's Sky (2015)
Being Good (2015)
The Cross (2016), Shunsuke's mother
Tomoshibi (2017)
My Friend "A" (2018), Yayoi Shiraishi
Aiuta: My Promise To Nakuhito (2019)
Mentai Piriri (2019), Chiyoko Umino
Fukushima 50 (2020)
The Mukoda Barber Shop (2022)
The Lines That Define Me (2022), Suizan Tōdō
Mentai Piriri 2023 (2023), Chiyoko Umino

Television
 Mōri Motonari (1997) - Lady Myōkyū
 Gō (2011) - Lady Kasuga
 Asa ga Kita (2015) - Kazu
 Hitoshi Ueki and Nobosemon (2017)
 Scarlet (2019–20)

References

External links
 

1969 births
Living people
Japanese film actresses
Japanese television actresses
Japanese idols
Actors from Fukuoka Prefecture
Amuse Inc. talents